Cathay Pacific Flight 700Z was a flight from Singapore to Hong Kong. Cathay Pacific used a Convair CV-880 aircraft that crashed in Vietnam on the afternoon of 15 June 1972. The cause was determined to have been an explosive device, likely located within the passenger cabin. A suspect in the bombing was acquitted at trial.

Flight 700Z originated from Singapore International Airport (now the Paya Lebar Air Base) and had a stopover at Bangkok's Don Mueang International Airport, with the final destination being Hong Kong's Kai Tak Airport.

At 0542 hours GMT (1242 local time), the flight made contact with Saigon ACC. At 0544, the crew made a routine transmission updating the progress of their route, adding that they would expect to reach their next waypoint by 0606 GMT. This was the last transmission received from the flight.

Investigation 
The wreckage was located in "lightly wooded" terrain, still burning, not long after Saigon ACC lost contact. Although two bodies were retrieved almost immediately, the presence of hostile forces nearby made it very difficult to examine the wreckage in depth. The spread of debris suggested that the airplane had broken into three large sections, with the breakpoints almost exactly along the front and rear of the wingbox, prior to hitting the ground, and the relative closeness of these sections suggested that this breakup had occurred at a low altitude. Other debris, including two engines and the horizontal stabilizer, could be seen further away from helicopters, but could not be reached on foot due to war activity. The aircraft was not equipped with a cockpit voice recorder.

Upon examining the available debris, it soon became clear that the aircraft had suffered some sort of structural problem and loss of control at cruising altitude, and that the low-altitude breakup was caused by the overstressing of the airplane during an uncontrolled descent. Debris from the centre fuselage and right wing root showed signs of explosive "splash", and the number 3 fuel tank showed signs that it had ruptured prior to the low-altitude breakup inferred from the wreckage distribution. The vertical stabilizer showed signs that it had been struck by "at least one body and possibly some seats", and the horizontal stabilizer also showed signs of being damaged by debris in the air. Many bodies were not recovered, possibly because they had been ejected very early in this sequence. Without being able to better examine the wreckage, and lacking valid flight data from the final moments of the flight, it is not known what exactly happened after 0559 GMT. What is apparent is that some sort of explosive device, likely located within the passenger cabin near the right wingbox, detonated at that time, causing unknown but catastrophic damage to the aircraft, including but not limited to the damage found on the horizontal and vertical stabilizer. The aircraft likely descended rapidly in an "erratic" manner. At an undetermined point in this descent, the horizontal stabilizer separated from the airplane entirely, and eventually the fuselage broke into the three sections initially found by searchers.

Aftermath
Following a UK Civil Aviation Authority and Hong Kong police investigation, as well as six years of reporting by a Bangkok Post journalist, "a police officer whose fiancée and daughter were aboard was charged with the crime". Somchai Chaiyasut, who had taken out three travel insurance policies on his fiancée and daughter, was declared not guilty due to lack of evidence. He sued the insurance companies and received 5.5 million baht ($US ). He died of cancer in 1985. It was reported that "airline staff and relatives [had considered] hiring a hitman to kill him".

References

External links

 Crash site of Flight 700Z from Associated Press Archive

Airliner bombings
Aviation accidents and incidents in 1972
Aviation accidents and incidents in Vietnam
Cathay Pacific accidents and incidents
Accidents and incidents involving the Convair 880
1972 crimes in Vietnam
Mass murder in 1972
June 1972 events in Asia
1970s murders in Vietnam
1972 murders in Asia
Explosions in 1972